Till Fellner (born 9 March 1972) is an Austrian pianist.

Biography 
Till Fellner was born in Vienna and studied at the Konservatorium der Stadt Wien with Helene Sedo-Stadler, and subsequently with Alfred Brendel, Meira Farkas, Oleg Maisenberg and Claus-Christian Schuster. He won first prize in the Clara Haskil International Piano Competition in Vevey, Switzerland in 1993, and was awarded the Mozartinterpretationspreis of the Mozart Society of Vienna in 1998.

Fellner has played with orchestras such as the Berlin Philharmonic, Vienna Philharmonic, Royal Concertgebouw Orchestra, New York Philharmonic, Boston Symphony Orchestra, Chicago Symphony Orchestra, and NHK Symphony Orchestra. 
He has worked with Claudio Abbado, Vladimir Ashkenazy, Herbert Blomstedt, Semyon Bychkov, Christoph von Dohnányi, Christoph Eschenbach, Bernard Haitink, Nikolaus Harnoncourt, Manfred Honeck, Sir Charles Mackerras, Sir Neville Marriner, Kurt Masur, Kent Nagano, Jonathan Nott, Kirill Petrenko, and Hans Zender.

He has performed at the BBC Proms London, Festival de la Roque d' Anthéron, Hollywood Bowl Los Angeles, Klavier-Festival Ruhr, Lucerne Festival, Mostly Mozart Festival New York, Salzburg Festival, Schubertiade Schwarzenberg, Tanglewood Music Festival, and Vienna Festival.

An active chamber musician, Fellner regularly collaborates with the Belcea Quartet, tenor Mark Padmore, violinist Lisa Batiashvili and cellist Adrian Brendel.

Fellner has received critical acclaim for his performances of the masterworks of the baroque, classical, and romantic periods, particularly compositions by J.S. Bach, Mozart, Beethoven, Schubert, and Liszt. He performs musical rarities such as the piano sonata of Julius Reubke, which was composed in Weimar under the aegis of Liszt. Fellner also performs music of the Second Viennese School of Arnold Schoenberg, Alban Berg and Anton Webern, as well as the contemporary classical music of Heinz Holliger, György Kurtág, Thomas Larcher, and Harrison Birtwistle, including some premieres.

In 2008–2010, Fellner performed Beethoven's 32 piano sonatas in a seven-recital series in Vienna, Paris, London, New York City, and Tokyo. He also performed and recorded Beethoven's Piano Concertos Nos. 4 and 5 with the Montreal Symphony under the baton of Kent Nagano. In 2009, Fellner was featured in the award-winning German-Austrian documentary Pianomania, about a Steinway & Sons piano tuner, which was directed by Lilian Franck and Robert Cibis. The film was met with a positive review by The New York Times.

He has taught at the Zurich Hochschule der Künste since autumn 2013.

In 2016, his recording of the piano quintet by J. Brahms with the Belcea Quartet received the "Diapason d'Or de l'Année".

In autumn 2019, Fellner served as jury president of the 62nd Ferruccio Busoni International Piano Competition in Bolzano.

Recordings 
Schubert: 4 Impromptus, D 935, Op. posth. 142; Arnold Schoenberg: Suite, Op. 25; Beethoven: Sonata No. 23 in F minor, Op. 57 'Appassionata'. EMI Austria, 567 7 54497 2 (1992)
Mozart: Piano Concerto No. 22 in E flat major, K 482 (Orchestre de Chambre de Lausanne/Uri Segal); Mozart: Rondo in A minor, K 511; Beethoven: Sonata No. 5 in C minor, Op. 10 No. 1. Claves, CD 50-9328 (1994)
Beethoven: Piano Concerto No. 2 in B flat major, Op. 19; Beethoven: Piano Concerto No. 3 in C minor, Op. 37 (The Academy of St. Martin in the Fields/Sir Neville Marriner). Erato, 4509-98539-2 (1995)
Schumann: Kreisleriana, Op. 16; Julius Reubke: Sonata in B-flat minor. Erato, 0630-12710-2 (1996)
Schubert: Sonata in A minor, D 784, Op. posth. 143; Schubert: 6 Moments musicaux, D 780, Op. 94; Schubert: 12 Grazer Walzer, D 924, Op. 91. Erato, 0630-17869-2 (1997)
Mozart: Piano Concerto No. 19 in F major, K 459; Mozart: Piano Concerto No. 25 in C major, K 503 (Camerata Academica Salzburg/Alexander Janiczek). Erato, 3984-23299-2 (1998)
Beethoven: The Complete Works for Cello and Piano (Heinrich Schiff, cello). Philips, 462 601-2 (2000)
J. S. Bach: The Well-Tempered Clavier, Book I, BWV 846–869. ECM New Series, 1853/54 (2004)
J. S. Bach: Inventions & Sinfonias, French Suite No. V. ECM New Series, 2043 (2009)
Beethoven: Piano Concerto No. 4 in G major, Op. 58; Piano Concerto No. 5 in E-flat major, Op. 73 (Orchestre symphonique de Montréal/Kent Nagano). ECM New Series, 2114 (2010)
Thomas Larcher: Böse Zellen for piano and orchestra (Münchener Kammerorchester/Dennis Russell Davies). ECM New Series, 2111 (2010)
 Harrison Birtwistle: Chamber Music (Lisa Batiashvili, Adrian Brendel, Roderick Williams). ECM New Series, 2253 (2014)
J. Brahms: Piano Quintet in F minor, Op. 34 (Belcea Quartet). Alpha, 248 (2016)
F. Liszt: Années de pèlerinage, Première année – Suisse; Beethoven: Piano Sonata No. 32 in C minor, Op. 111. ECM New Series, 2511 (2018)

References

External links 
 
 Biographical sketch and discography at ECM Records
 Interview with Till Fellner, 11 April 1997

1972 births
Living people
20th-century Austrian musicians
20th-century Austrian male musicians
21st-century Austrian musicians
20th-century classical pianists
21st-century classical pianists
Austrian classical pianists
Male classical pianists
ECM Records artists
Musicians from Vienna
21st-century male musicians
Erato Records artists